SNO+ is a physics experiment designed to search for neutrinoless double beta decay, with secondary measurements of proton–electron–proton (pep) solar neutrinos, geoneutrinos from radioactive decays in the Earth, and reactor neutrinos. It is under construction (as of February 2017) using the underground equipment already installed for the former Sudbury Neutrino Observatory (SNO) experiment at SNOLAB. It could also observe supernovae neutrinos if a supernova occurs in our galaxy.

Physics goals 
Secondary physics goals include measurement of neutrinos or antineutrinos from:
 Proton-electron-proton (pep) and carbon-nitrogen-oxygen (CNO) cycles within the Sun to better understand neutrino-matter interaction and solar composition.
 Beta decay of uranium and thorium within the Earth (geoneutrinos) to constrain Earth's radioactive heat budget.
 Beta decay of fission daughter products in nuclear reactors (reactor antineutrinos) to better constrain neutrino oscillation parameters.
 Supernova neutrinos and antineutrinos for early warning detection of supernova (see Supernova Early Warning System).
 Nucleon decay into neutrinos, which would indicate a violation of baryon conservation.

Testing and construction 
The previous experiment, SNO, used water within the sphere and relied on Cherenkov radiation interaction. The SNO+ experiment will use the sphere filled with linear alkyl benzene to act as a liquid scintillator and target material. The sphere is surrounded with photomultiplier tubes and the assembly is floated in water and the sphere held down against the resulting buoyant forces by ropes. Testing (filled with water) is expected to begin early 2016, with full operation with liquid a few months after that, and Tellurium loading begins in 2017.

A neutrino interaction with this liquid produces several times more light than an interaction in a water Cherenkov experiment such as the original SNO experiment or Super-Kamiokande. The energy threshold for the detection of neutrinos can, therefore, be lower, and proton–electron–proton solar neutrinos (with an energy of ) can be observed. In addition, a liquid scintillator experiment can detect anti-neutrinos like those created in nuclear fission reactors and the decay of thorium and uranium in the earth.

Originally the plan was to fill with 0.3%  (800 kg), but later talks have cited 0.5% (1.3 tonnes)

Earlier proposals placed more emphasis on neutrino observations. The current emphasis on neutrinoless double beta decay is because the interior of the acrylic vessel has been significantly contaminated by radioactive daughter products of the radon gas that is common in the mine air. These could leach into the scintillator, where some would be removed by the filtration system, but the remainder may interfere with low-energy neutrino measurements. The neutrinoless double beta decay observations are not affected by this. 

The project received funding for initial construction from NSERC in April 2007. As of early 2013, the cavity had been refurbished and re-sealed to new cleanliness standards, more stringent than for the original SNO due to the new experiment's greater sensitivity.

The main civil engineering challenge is that the current SNO vessel is supported by a series of ropes, to prevent the weight of the heavy water inside from sinking it in the surrounding normal water. The proposed liquid scintillator (linear alkylbenzene) is lighter than water, and must be held down instead, but still without blocking the view of its interior. The existing support rope attachment points, cast into the acrylic sphere's equator, are not suitable for upside-down use.

Computing 
The collaboration is investigating the use of grid resources to deliver the computing power needed by the experiment. This is after the success of the LHC Computing Grid (wLCG) used by the LHC experiments. The SNO+ VO has been using resources provided by GridPP.

References

Further reading 
 SNO+ Letter of Intent
 The SNO+ detector
 Past, present and future of SNO: SNO, SNO+ and SNOLAB (pdf)
 Current Status and Future Prospects of the SNO+ Experiment (Nov 2015)

External links 
 SNO+ home page
 SNO+ experiment record on INSPIRE-HEP

Neutrino observatories
Particle experiments